Picada Café or Kaffeeschneiss in the local German dialect (i.e. Riograndenser Hunsrückisch) is a municipality in the state of Rio Grande do Sul, Brazil. It is located around 80 kilometers from the state capital of Porto Alegre.

Economy
The local economy depends largely on small farming; and increasingly on national (internal) tourism which in turn revolves around its Germanic roots and traditions, perceived as exotic.

Minority language
Since its foundation in 1840s and from its pioneering days onward, the Riograndenser Hunsrückisch language, a Brazilian variety of German largely based on the Rhine Franonian, has been present in this community.

There are many other municipalities with this bilingual profile throughout the state. In 2012 the state chamber of deputies voted unanimously in favor of recognizing this Germanic dialect an official historical culture good to be preserved.

See also
List of municipalities in Rio Grande do Sul
Serra Gaúcha

References

Municipalities in Rio Grande do Sul